Majal may refer to:
 Majal (organization), a non-profit organisation in the Middle East
 Majal, Barmer, a settlement in Rajasthan, India